A. R. M. Hameem was a Ceylonese politician who was a member of the Senate of Ceylon from 1963 to 1969, working closely with Badi-ud-din Mahmud.

References

Sri Lankan Moors
Members of the Senate of Ceylon
Sri Lanka Freedom Party politicians